Potassium channel tetramerisation domain containing 15 also known as BTB/POZ domain-containing protein KCTD15 is protein that in humans is encoded by the KCTD15 gene.

Clinical significance 

Variants of the KCTD15 gene may be associated with obesity.

See also
 Potassium channel tetramerisation domain

References

Further reading